Every Body Looking is a young adult novel in verse by Candice Iloh, published September 22, 2020 by Dutton Books for Young Readers.

Reception 
Every Body Looking was well-received by critics, including starred reviews from Kirkus Reviews, Booklist, and Publishers Weekly. 

Kirkus Reviews referred to the book as a "young woman’s captivating, sometimes heartbreaking, yet ultimately hopeful story about coming into her own." Teen Vogue called it "[l]yrical, insightful, and searing," and Buffalo News called it " a stunning debut."

Booklist wrote, "This debut is a testament to the beauty of Black girls, their circumstances, bodies, and cultures. A title to savor slowly, this is a captivating read, with even more depth imbued in the formatting and play with white space."

BookPage wrote, "Iloh movingly explores the concept of safety through Ada’s relationships with her parents, as well as in her evolving perspectives on money, potential careers and budding romantic crushes. Teen readers who long for more independence than adults are willing to grant them, or who long to be seen as individuals rather than vessels for adult influence and direction, will find many points of identification with Ada’s story."

The book also received positive reviews from The New York Times and School Library Journal.

Kirkus Reviews named Every Body Looking one of the best books of 2020.

References

See also 

2020 American novels
Young adult novels
Dutton Children's Books books
African-American novels
2020 children's books